
The following lists events that happened during 1844 in South Africa.

Events
 April - Voortrekkers from Natal cross back over the Drakensberg Mountains and settle at Potchefstroom
 Land ownership in the Cape Colony is changed from leasehold to free hold
 The settlement of Victoria West is established
 The Voortrekker leader Hendrik Potgieter settle at Delagoa Bay, Mozambique

Births
 5 October - Francis William Reitz, South African lawyer, politician, and statesman, president of the Orange Free State born in Swellendam, Cape Colony.

References
See Years in South Africa for list of References

 
South Africa
Years in South Africa